Piet Dumortier (9 November 1915 – 5 April 1945) was a Dutch footballer. He played in one match for the Netherlands national football team in 1938.

References

External links
 

1915 births
1945 deaths
Dutch footballers
Netherlands international footballers
Footballers from Utrecht (city)
Association football forwards
DHSC players